The 1965 Michigan Wolverines football team was an American football team that represented the University of Michigan in the 1965 Big Ten Conference football season.  In its seventh year under head coach Bump Elliott, Michigan compiled a 4–6 record (2–5 against conference opponents), finished in seventh place in the Big Ten, and outscored opponents by a combined total of 185 to 161.

Ranked No. 4 in the preseason AP poll, the Wolverines were plagued by injuries throughout the season and lost close games to No. 7 Purdue (17–15, decided by two missed extra points), Minnesota (14–13, decided by a missed two-point conversion), and Ohio State (9–7, decided on a last-minute field goal after Michigan out-gained the Buckeyes).

Linebacker Tom Cecchini was the team captain, and defensive tackle Bill Yearby received the team's most valuable player award. Yearby was also a consensus first-team All-American. Four Michigan players received first-team All-Big Ten honors: Yearby, running back Carl Ward, offensive tackle Tom Mack, and defensive back Rich Volk.

The team's statistical leaders included quarterback Wally Gabler with 825 passing yards and 42 points scored, Carl Ward with 639 rushing yards, and right end Jack Clancy with 762 receiving yards.

Schedule

Season summary

Pre-season
The 1964 Michigan Wolverines football team compiled a 9–1 record, won the Big Ten championship, and was ranked No. 4 in the final AP poll. 

In January 1965, Michigan's players selected defensive end Tom Cecchini to be the captain of the 1965 team.

In April 1965, Bill Keating won the Meyer Morton Trophy as the player showing the greatest development in spring practice, and Rocky Rosema received the John Maulbetsch Scholarship, awarded to a freshman player "on the basis of need, scholarship, capacity, and desire for leadership and success."

Multiple starters returned from the 1964 team, including Cecchini, Tom Mack, Carl Ward, Jim Detwiler, Dave Fisher, and Bill Yearby. In addition, Barry Dehlin, Jack Clancy, and John Rowser returned to the team after missing all or most of the 1964 season due to injury.

In the Associated Press' annual preseason college football poll, Michigan received five first place ballots and was ranked fourth with 282 points, trailing Nebraska (311 points), Texas (292 points), and Notre Dame (282 points).

at North Carolina

    
    
    
    
    
    
    
    
    

Michigan was ranked No. 4 in the pre-season AP poll. On September 18, 1965, the team opened its season on the road with a 31–24 victory over North Carolina. The game was played in "brutal, suffocating heat" that reached 100 degrees on the field with humidity near 80 per cent. Bump Elliott said after the game it felt like 186 degrees, "the hottest weather I've ever seen."

Michigan took a 21–0 lead after the first 18 minutes of the game, scoring on a 31-yard touchdown run by quarterback Wally Gabler and two touchdown runs by halfback Jim Detwiler. As the game progressed, the heat slowed the Wolverines, as Bill Yearby, Tom Cecchini, Paul Johnson, and Dave Fisher all left the game with heat sickness. Detwiler and Rich Volk also left the game with knee injuries. The Tar Heels scored 16 unanswered points against the depleted Wolverines – a 53-yard interception return by Bill Darnall, a 21-yard field goal, and a 12-yard touchdown pass from Danny Talbott to John Atherton. 

In the fourth quarter, Dick Vidmer replaced Gabler at quarterback and revitalized the offense. He led a drive that culminated in a 33-yard field goal by Dick Sygar and later threw a 10-yard pass to Steve Smith, the ball bouncing off Smith and into the hands of Jack Clancy for the game-clinching touchdown. North Carolina concluded the scoring with a 19-yard touchdown pass from Jeff Beaver to Max Chapman.

Michigan rushed for 255 yards in the game, including 50 yards by Detwiler, 48 by Sygar, 46 by Carl Ward, and 44 by Gabler. Quarterbacks Vidmer and Gabler combined to complete 6 of 12 passes for 74 yards and one interception.

California

    
    
    

On September 25, Michigan defeated California, 10–7, in its home opener before a crowd of 81,417. Jim Detwiler did not play due to a knee injury sustained in the North Carolina game.

Michigan took a 10–0 lead at halftime on a 17-yard field goal by Dick Sygar, set up by a Frank Nunley interception, and a one-yard touchdown run by quarterback Dick Vidmer. 

Turnovers allowed California to keep the game close. Michigan fumbled five times (losing three) and threw two interceptions. In the third quarter, California narrowed the lead on a 16-yard touchdown pass from Dan Berry to Ted Parks.

In the fourth first quarter, the game nearly got away from the Wolverines when Vidmer turned the ball over as he pitched the ball into an empty backfield on a sweep play. Michigan forced California to punt, but the ball caromed off Rich Volk's chest as he tried to execute a fair catch. Cal recovered the fumble at the Wolverines' 30-yard line, then fumbled at the 12-yard line with 59 second remaining in the game. Paul Johnson recovered the loose ball, allowing the Wolverines to run out the clock. 

Michigan totaled 223 rushing yards led by Carl Ward (75 yards), Dick Sygar (60 yards), and Dave Fisher (58 yards). Vidmer completed 8 of 14 passes for 103 yards. Jack Clancy caught six passes for 71 yards.

Following the game, Michigan dropped from No. 4 to No. 7 in the AP poll.

Georgia

    
    
    
    
    

On October 2, No. 7 Michigan lost to No. 10 Georgia by a 15–7 score before a crowd of 59,470 at Michigan Stadium. The loss broke an eight-game winning streak for Michigan that dated back to October 24, 1964. 

Michigan took a 7–6 halftime lead on a one-yard touchdown run by fullback Tim Radigan. Michigan's lead held until the final five minutes of the game. With 4:11 remaining, Georgia quarterback Preston Ridlehuber rolled out on an option play and threw a 10-yard touchdown pass to Pat Hodgson. Georgia tried for a two-point conversion but Michigan defender Dick Wells knocked down Ridlehuber's pass, and the Bulldogs led, 12–7. On the ensuing possession, Lynn Hughes intercepted a Dick Vidmer pass and returned it to Michigan's nine-yard line. Georgia kicker Bobby Etter concluded the scoring with his third field goal.

Michigan was limited to 128 rushing yards (led by Dave Fisher with 66 yards on 13 carries) and 107 passing yards (led by Vidmer with 75 yards on four-of-nine passing). Jack Clancy led the Wolverines' offense with five catches for 90 yards.

Michigan State

    
    
    
    
    
    

On October 9, Michigan lost its annual rivalry game to No. 5 Michigan State by a 24–7 score. The game was played at Michigan Stadium before a crowd of 
103,219.

Michigan State opened the scoring with a one-yard touchdown plunge by quarterback Steve Juday. Michigan responded with an 87-yard touchdown drive in the second quarter, capped by Wally Gabler's one-yard run. The Spartans added a 20-yard field goal by its barefoot kicker, Dick Kenney, and led 9–7 at halftime. Michigan State's first-half scores followed turnovers (a fumble recovery and an interception) by linebacker George Webster.

In the second half, Michigan played without its offensive stars, Jim Detwiler, Carl Ward, and Jack Clancy, each of whom sustained injuries in the game. The Spartans held the Wolverines scoreless, as the Michigan State offense added 15 points on two touchdowns (including a 39-yard run by Samoan fullback Bob Apisa) and a second field goal.

Michigan's running game limited to -38 rushing yards, including -50 yards by quarterback Dick Vidmer and two yards on seven carries for Carl Ward. With the run game stymied, Michigan turned to the air, completing 17 of 40 passes for 287 yards. Split end Steve Smith was the team's offensive leader with seven catches for 110 yards. Michigan gave up two interceptions and fumbled seven times, three resulting in turnovers.

Purdue

    
    
    
    
    
    

On October 16, Michigan lost to No. 7 Purdue by a 17–15 score before a homecoming crowd of 85,905 at Michigan Stadium.

Michigan took a 6–0 lead at halftime on a 17-yard touchdown run by Carl Ward. Bob Griese led Purdue's comeback in the third quarter with touchdown passes of 24 yards to Jim Finley and six yards to Jim Beirne. For the game, Griese completed 22 of 38 passes for 273 yards.

Michigan narrowed the lead on a 40-yard touchdown pass from Wally Gabler to Jack Clancy later in the third quarter. In the fourth quarter, the Wolverines took a 15–14 lead on an 18-yard field goal by Dick Sygar.  Griese then kicked a game-winning, 35-yard field goal.

For Michigan, Dave Fisher and Jack Clancy led the team with 89 rushing yards and 125 receiving yards, respectively.

at Minnesota

    
    
    
    

On October 23, Michigan lost the annual Little Brown Jug rivalry game to Minnesota by a 14–13 score before a crowd of 58,519 at Memorial Stadium in Minneapolis. 

Michigan took a 7–0 halftime lead on a 14-yard touchdown pass from Carl Ward to Dave Fisher. The Golden Gophers tied the game in the third quarter and took a 14-7 lead in the fourth quarter on one-yard touchdown run by quarterback John Hankinson.

With 2:46 remaining in the game, Michigan took possession at its own 48-yard line. Wally Gabler led that Wolverines on a seven-play, 52-yard drive capped by Gabler's four-yard touchdown run. Rather than kick for the extra point to tie the game, Michigan went for the two-point conversion to win. Gabler took the snap and rolled out to his left searching for an open receiver. With Minnesota defensive end Bob Bruggers rushing at him, Gabler tossed the ball in the direction of Steve Smith, but the pass fell incomplete.

Wisconsin

    
    
    
    
    
    
    
    
    
    

On October 30, Michigan defeated Wisconsin, 50–14, before a crowd of 66,907 at Michigan Stadium.

Michigan began the scoring on its first offensive play, 99 seconds into the game, with a 52-yard touchdown pass from Wally Gabler to Jack Clancy. After forcing a Wisconsin punt, Carl Ward ran 53 yards on Michigan's second play from scrimmage.  The scoring continued unabated, and Michigan led, 50–0, with five and a half minutes left in the third quarter.  With the game well in hand, the Wolverines emptied the bench and broke an "unofficial" school record by rotating 62 players into the game.

The Wolverines totaled 360 rushing yards led by Dave Fisher (106 yards) and Carl Ward (84 yards). Wally Gabler rushed for 24 yards and two touchdowns and completed 5 of 12 passes for 121 yards and a touchdown. Jack Clancy caught four passes for 105 yards and two touchdowns.

at Illinois

    
    
    
    
    

On November 6, Michigan defeated Illinois, 23–3, before a crowd of 50,136 at 
Memorial Stadium in Champaign, Illinois. The game was the sixth straight victory for Bump Elliott against his brother, Pete Elliott, head coach of Illinois since 1960.

The Wolverines out-gained Illinois by 423 yards to 254 yards.  On the ground, the margin was 306 yards to 130 yards. Carl Ward led the way with 139 rushing yards and scored two touchdowns, the first on a one-yard run and the second on a five-yard pass from Wally Gabler. Gabler completed 7 of 12 passes for 124 yards and rushed for 68 yards and a touchdown.

at Northwestern

    
    
    
    
    
    
    
    
    

On November 13, Michigan lost to Northwestern, 34–22, before a crowd of 40,007 at Dyche Stadium in Evanston, Illinois.

On its first possession of the game, Michigan drove 88 yards in 21 plays, ending with Wally Gabler's three-yard touchdown run. In the second quarter, Northwestern quick-kicked 57 yards to Michigan's 12-yard line. Michigan was stopped on the ensuing drive, and Stan Kemp's punt from the end zone was blocked. Northwestern recovered the ball at Michigan's one-yard line and then scored on a one-yard plunge by quarterback Denny Boothe. Michigan retook the lead on a 21-yard field goal by Rick Sygar, but Booth completed a 45-yard touchdown pass to Dick Smith, giving Northwestern a 14–10 lead at halftime.

Northwestern drove 74 yards early in the third quarter, capped by a nine-yard touchdown run by Ron Rector. Michigan responded with a 19-yard touchdown pass to Jack Clancy. Late in the third quarter and early in the fourth, Northwestern fullback Bob McKelvey rushed for two touchdowns to extend the lead to 34–16. For the game, McKelvey rushed for 136 yards and two touchdowns on 35 carries. Michigan scored a final touchdown on a three-yard run by Dave Fisher.

Ohio State

    
    
    

On November 20, Michigan lost its annual rivalry game with Ohio State by a 9–7 score before a crowd of 77,733 at Michigan Stadium.

In the first quarter, Ohio State took a 6–0 lead on a four-yard touchdown pass from Don Unverth to Billy Anders. Bob Funk missed the kick for extra point.

With 3:14 remaining in the first half, after an interception by Mike Bass, Michigan scored on a two-yard touchdown run by Dave Fisher. Dick Sygar's kick for extra point put Michigan ahead, 7–6. Michigan's lead held until the closing minutes.

With seven and a half minutes remaining, a punt by Stan Kemp pinned the Buckeyes at their own nine-yard line. Ohio State drove 74 yards in 15 plays, and with 75 second remaining in the game, Bob Funk kicked a 28-yard, game-winning field goal. In the final 75 seconds, Wally Gabler drove the Wolverines to the Ohio State 33-yard line. With 10 seconds remaining, Paul D'Eramo's kick for a long field goal failed.

Michigan out-gained Ohio State by 249 rushing yards 138 yards. Carl Ward and Dave Fisher led the Wolverines with 104 yards and 96 yards, respectively. In the air, the Buckeyes out-gained the Wolverines by 123 yards to 86 yards. Jack Clancy caught seven passes for 86 yards. Clancy ended the season with 52 receptions to set a single-season school record.

Post-season

All-American

Defensive tackle Bill Yearby was a consensus player on the 1965 All-America team.> He received first-team honors from the United Press International (UPI), American Football Coaches Association, Newspaper Enterprise Association (NEA), Central Press Association, Sporting News, Time magazine, and the Walter Camp Football Foundation. He received second-team honors from the Associated Press (AP).

The only other Michigan player to receive All-America honors was offensive tackle Tom Mack who received second-team honors from the UPI and NEA.

All-Big Ten
Seven Michigan players received recognition from the AP and/or UPI on their 1965 All-Big Ten Conference football teams. They were:
 Bill Yearby (AP-1, UPI-1);
 Tom Mack (AP-1, UPI-1);  
 Rich Volk (AP-1, UPI-1); 
 Carl Ward (AP-1, UPI-1); 
 Tom Cecchini (AP-2, UPI-2); 
 Jack Clancy (UPI-2);
 Charles Kines (UPI-2)

Team honors
At Michigan's annual football bust, held on November 29 at Cobo Hall in Detroit, varsity letters were presented to 44 players.  Team awards were presented as follows: 

 Bill Yearby received the Lou Hyde award, having been selected by his teammates as Michigan's most valuable player. 

Pete Hollis received the Patterson Award as the team's outstanding academic senior with a 3.8 grade point average.

NFL Draft
The 1965 NFL Draft was held in New York City on November 27, 1965. The following Michigan players were drafted:

 Tom Mack - selected by the Los Angeles Rams in the first round, second overall pick. 

 Steve Smith - selected by the San Francisco 49ers in the fifth round, 71st overall pick.

 Jack Clancy - selected by the St. Louis Cardinals in the fifth round, 73rd overall pick.

 Charles Kines - selected by the Chicago Bears in the 18th round, 272nd overall pick.

Personnel

Letter winners
The following 44 players received varsity letters for their participation on the 1965 football team. Players starting at least five games are displayed in bold.

Offense

 Donald Bailey, 5'11", 198 pounds, junior, Greenberg, PA – started 8 games at right offensive guard
 Thomas Brigstock, 6'1", 197 pounds, senior, Battle Creek, MI - halfback
 Jack Clancy, 6'1", 195 pounds, junior, Detroit – started 7 games at right offensive end
 Floyd A. Day, 6'2", 202 pounds, senior, Canton, MI - guard
 Joseph Dayton, 6'2", 218 pounds, sophomore, Detroit – started 7 games at center
 Jim Detwiler, 6'3", 215 pounds, junior, Toledo, OH - started 3 games at left halfback
 Paul D'Eramo, 5'10", 212 pounds, sophomore, Youngstown, OH - started 2 games at center
 Dave Fisher, 5'10", 215 pounds, junior, Kettering, OH – started 5 games at fullback
 Dennis Flanagan, 6'2", 215 pounds, senior, Niles, MI – started 5 games at left offensive guard
 Wally Gabler, 6'2", 195 pounds, senior, Royal Oak, MI – started 5 games at quarterback
 Henry Hanna, 6'0", 220 pounds, junior, Youngstown, OH - started 1 game at left offensive guard
 William Hardy, 6'1", 225 pounds, junior, Detroit - started 2 games at right offensive tackle
 Peter Hollis, 6'0", 190 pounds, senior, Detroit - quarterback
 Bill Keating, 6'2", 226 pounds, senior, Chicago - started 2 games at left offensive guard
 Stanley Kemp, 6'1", 185 pounds, junior, Greenville, MI - started 1 game at right offensive end
 Charles Kines, 6'1", 238 pounds, senior, Niles, MI – started 8 games at left offensive tackle
 Craig Kirby, 6'2", 185 pounds, senior, Royal Oak, MI - end
 Louis Lee, 6'2", 192 pounds, junior, Willow Grove, PA -halfback
 Tom Mack, 6'3", 235 pounds, senior, Bucyrus, OH – started 7 games at right offensive tackle
 Dennis Morgan, 5'11", 222 pounds, sophomore, Phoenixville, PA - started 3 games at fullback
 Thomas Parkhill, 6'2", 205 pounds, senior, Ada, MI - end
 Raymond Phillips, 6'3", 222 pounds, sophomore, Evanston, IL - tackle
 Tim Radigan, 5'11", 206 pounds, junior, Lansing, MI - started 1 game at fullback
 John Rowser, 6'0", 182 pounds, junior, Detroit - halfback
 Gary Schick, 6'2", 215 pounds, senior, Grosse Pointe, MI - started 1 game at fullback
 Ernie Sharpe, 5'11", 190 pounds, sophomore, Palos Heights, IL - started 1 game at quarterback
 Steve Smith, 6'5", 229 pounds, senior, Park Ridge, IL – started 7 games at left offensive end
 Dick Sygar, 5'11", 180 pounds, junior, Niles, OH - started 4 games at left halfback, 1 game at safety, also handled kicking
 Dick Vidmer, 6'0", 184 pounds, Greensburg, PA - started 3 games at quarterback
 Carl Ward, 5'9", 177 pounds, junior, Cincinnati – started 7 games at right halfback

Defense
 Mike Bass, 6'0", 182 pounds, junior, Ypsilanti, MI – started 10 games at cornerback, 2 games at right offensive halfback, and 1 game at quarterback
 Tom Cecchini, 6'0", 194 pounds, senior, Detroit – started 10 games at linebacker
 Barry Dehlin, 5'11", 215 pounds, senior, Flushing, MI - started 1 game at defensive right guard
 Jeff Hoyne, 6'1", 190 pounds, senior, Chicago – started 7 games at defensive end (3 at left; 4 at right), 3 games at offensive end
 Paul Johnson, 6'0", 226 pounds, sophomore, Bay City, MI – started 7 games at right defensive tackle, 1 game at right offensive tackle
 Bob Mielke, 6'1", 218 pounds, junior, Chicago – started 10 games at defensive left guard, 2 games at offensive left guard
 Frank Nunley, 6'2", 222 pounds, junior, Belleville, MI – started 10 games at linebacker, 1 game at center, and 1 game at offensive right guard
 Tom Pullen, 6'4", 190 pounds, sophomore, Ottawa, Canada – started 6 games at right defensive end, 2 games at offensive end
 Rockey Rosema, 6'3", 208 pounds, sophomore, Grand Rapids, MI - started 2 games at defensive left end, 1 game at offensive tackle
 Charles Ruzicka, 6'1", 238 pounds, senior, Skokie, IL - started 3 games at defensive right tackle
 Rich Volk, 6'3", 190 pounds, junior, Wauseon, OH – started 10 games at cornerback, 4 games at offensive laeft halfback
 Dick Wells, 5'9", 178 pounds, senior, Grand Rapids, MI – started 9 games at safety, 1 game at offensive right halfback
 Clayton Wilhite, 6'4", 204 pounds, junior, Bay City, MI – started 5 games at left defensive end
 Ken Wright, 6'1", 215 pounds, junior, Bay City, MI – started 9 games at defensive right guard
 Bill Yearby, 6'3", 230 pounds, sophomore, Detroit – started 10 games at defensive left tackle, 1 game at left offensive tackle

Non-letter winners
 Dennis Brown, 6'2", 195 pounds, freshman, Lincoln Park, MI - end
 Tom Goss, 6'2", 217 pounds, sophomore, Knoxville, TN - tackle
 George Hoey, 5'10", 168 pounds, freshman, Flint, MI - halfback
 Ron Johnson, 6'0", 190 pounds, freshman, Detroit
 Tom Stincic, 6'3", 210 pounds, freshman, Cleveland - end

Coaching staff
Michigan's 1965 coaching, training, and support staff included the following persons.
Head coach: Bump Elliott
Assistant coaches: 
 Don Dufek, Sr. - defensive backfield coach
 Dennis Fitzgerald - freshman coach
 Henry Fonde - offensive backfield coach
 Bob Hollway - defensive line coach
 Tony Mason - offensive line coach
 Jack Nelson - ends coach
Trainer: Jim Hunt
Manager: David Muir

Statistical leaders
Michigan's individual statistical leaders for the 1965 season include those listed below.

Rushing

Passing

Receiving

Kickoff returns

Punt returns

References

Michigan
Michigan Wolverines football seasons
Michigan Wolverines football